The Ducati 998 is a sport bike made by Ducati from 2002 to 2004. It was the successor to the Ducati 996 and the final variation on the Ducati 916. The new Testastretta engine shared many similarities with the previous Desmoquattro engine in the 996, although it was completely new from the crankshaft up. Testastretta means narrow head and refers to a complete redesign of the cylinder heads. The desmodromic valve actuation method was retained.

The included valve angle was reduced from 40 degrees on the 996 to 25 degrees on the 998. Valve sizes were increased, and the camshafts had slightly increased lift, but with shorter duration. Horsepower increased from 112 to 123.

The 998R and non US 998S models had different crankcases with a deep oil sump. The standard 998 had crankcases which were very similar to the previous Desmoquattro. The non US 998S as well as the 998R had revised cam profiles which provided more power than the standard 998. The 998R model used a  mm bore and stroke which actually displaced 999 cc, and was very similar to the engine used in the subsequent 999R model.

In 2001, Ducati introduced the 996R (see Ducati 996) with the 998 cc Testastretta engine. This bike was the true introduction of the Testastretta engine and the 998 model. The engine was similar to the 2002 non US 998S. Only 500 were sold which was all that were needed to homologate the bike to race in the World Superbike Championship. This bike won the World Superbike Championship in 2001 with rider Troy Bayliss. Michael Rutter won the Macau Grand Prix in 2002 and 2003.

A 2001 Ducati 996, in dark green, was featured in the 2003 movie The Matrix Reloaded. Ducati subsequently announced a limited edition of similar bikes for model year 2004 in a very dark green color, but as production of the 996 had since ceased, these were actually 998-series bikes.

The 998 officially ended production in 2004 with the release of the 998s FE ("Final Edition"). This bike was only available by special order, it was not available as a regular production model. They were available in Biposto and Monoposto (one or two seat) versions. It was largely similar to the US model 2002 998S (using the standard 998 engine but with uprated Ohlins suspension components and Brembo four-piston calipers).

Ducati 998 models

998 Strada (Biposto and Monoposto): 2002-2003

998S Ben Bostrom and Troy Bayliss replicas (USA Version): 2002

998S non US model: 2002

998R: 2002

998 Matrix:2004

998 FE (Final Edition): 2004

998S FE (Final Edition): 2004

The final edition of the 916 family was produced in limited numbers and released in 2004. There were 981 of these bikes made but they were not individually numbered, but did have some identifying features. In total 419 biposto and 562 monoposto bikes were made. See breakdown below. The engine made 136bhp and was the newer testastretta unit that had previously been used in the R bikes and included Ohlins front and rear. Other features for this limited edition model are You get a Limited Edition plaque on the headstock, tank graphics, tri-colore tailpiece graphics and upgraded Ohlins front suspension.

References

998
Sport bikes
Motorcycles introduced in 2002